Orešnik is a Slovene-language surname. Notable people with the surname include:

 Janez Orešnik (born 1935), Slovene linguist
 Nives Orešnik (born 1992), Slovene model

See also
 Resnik (surname)

Slovene-language surnames